is a Japanese joint venture automotive company established by Sony Group Corporation and Honda Motor Company in 2022 to produce battery electric vehicles. The company will market its vehicles under the  brand.

The company plans to take pre-orders in the first half of 2025 and deliver the first cars to customers in North America in spring 2026. Production of the vehicle will take place at one of Honda's plants in the U.S.

History 
In January 2020, Sony revealed its first electric sedan prototype at the 53rd Consumer Electronics Show. The vehicle was called the Sony Vision-S. According to the company, the Vision-S incorporates Sony's imaging and sensing technologies. In contrast, Sony's artificial intelligence, telecommunication, and cloud computing technologies enable the continued updating and evolution of the vehicle's features. A second concept car, an electric SUV was unveiled in January 2022 at the at the 55th Consumer Electronics Show as the Vision-S 02, while the original concept was retroactively renamed to Vision-S 01.

In April 2022, Sony established Sony Mobility Inc. as their mobility service arm.

In March 2022, Sony and Honda signed a memorandum of understanding to deepen the discussion and exploration of forming a strategic alliance between the two companies. In June 2022, while still in the process of negotiating the details of the partnership, both companies announced that their joint venture company would be called "Sony Honda Mobility Inc."

The company was officially announced through a press conference on October 13, 2022. According to the company, it aims to become a software-oriented "Mobility Tech Company".

On January 5, 2023, the company revealed its first electric vehicle prototype under the brand name Afeela at the 56th Consumer Electronics Show. The prototype is a four-door sedan that will be produced in the U.S. in 2026 and will feature Level 3 automated driving capabilities under limited conditions.

Models

Afeela prototype 
Revealed in January 2023, the Afeela prototype is a four-door sedan that will be available for pre-order in the first half of 2025, while initial shipments will be delivered to customers in North America in the spring of 2026. It has 45 cameras and sensors inside and outside the vehicle to ensure its safety and security. At the same time, Qualcomm's system-on-a-chip technology, including their Snapdragon digital chassis, will be used by the vehicle, while the cockpit and software architecture has been enabled by Elektrobit Automotive, who also collaborated with Sony on software and UX for the Sony Vision-S, the electronics giant's first prototype. The car will be manufactured at one of Honda's North American plants. The company will also integrate Epic Games' Unreal Engine, a 3D computer graphics game engine, into their vehicles to help visualize in-car communication, safety, and entertainment.

References

External links 

 

Sony
Honda
Car manufacturers of Japan
Companies based in Tokyo
Joint ventures
Japanese companies established in 2022
Vehicle manufacturing companies established in 2022
Electric vehicle manufacturers of Japan
Battery electric vehicle manufacturers